Swapaanam (English translation: The Voiding Soul) is a 2014 Indian Malayalam film directed by Shaji N. Karun and produced by M. Rajan for Horizon Entertainments. The film features Jayaram and Kadambari in the lead roles, alongside Siddique, Vineeth, Lakshmi Gopalaswamy in supporting roles. The music was composed by Sreevalsan J Menon, while the script was written by Harikrishnan and Sajeev Pazhoor, based on Shaji’s own story. The film was screened in the Dubai International Film Festival.

The film released with Auro 3D sound  in selected theatres, becoming the first Malayalam movie and fourth Indian film to employ the technology after Maryan (Tamil), Vishwaroopam(Tamil) and 1- Nenokkadine (Telugu).

Plot
The rhythm of life, even for a master drummer, is at the same moment disrupted and harmonized by the love, passion, jealousy, hate and spite of those around. Unequaled in the art of playing the Chenda, Unni, and Nalini, peerless in Mohiniyattam, are drawn to each other by an affection that transcends the devotion to their arts and the love for each other.  The pulse of their passion cannot hold up against the tumults of Unni’s life. A brother and a father figure, whose love sours to jealousy and hate, a wife who despises his drumming and a mother from whom the truth about his birth is not forthcoming all hasten the tempo of a mental imbalance rooted in Unni’s childhood to an inevitable dark end.

Cast
 Jayaram as Unni
 Kadambari as Nalini
 Siddique as Narayanan Namboodiri 
 Vineeth as Thuppan Namboodiri
 Sharath Das as Prakashan
 Ashwini Ranga as Unni’s Mother 
 P.D.Namboodiri as Achyuthan
 Udayan Namboodiri as Kuttan
 Lakshmi Gopalaswamy as Kalyani
 Indrans as Selvam
 P. Sreekumar as Shankaran Marar
 Namboothiri as Temple Priest 
 K. Suresh Kurup as Pookatri Thirumeni 
 Sajitha Madathil as Kuttan’s Wife 
 Margi Sathi as Achyuthan’s Wife
 M.Thankamani (Retd. AIR Staff) as Vineeth's Mother

Soundtrack

Awards
 National Film Award for Best Audiography - D. Yuvaraj

References

External links
 

2010s Malayalam-language films
Films scored by Sreevalsan J. Menon
Films directed by Shaji N. Karun
Films that won the Best Audiography National Film Award